African-American folktales are the storytelling and oral history of enslaved African Americans during the 1700-1900s. These stories reveal life lessons, spiritual teachings, and cultural knowledge and wisdom for the African-American community African-American cultural heritage. During slavery, African-Americans created folk stories that spoke about the hardships of slavery and created folk spirits and heroes that were able to out wit and out smart their slaveholders and defeat their enemies. These folk stories gave hope to enslaved people that folk spirits will free them from slavery. Many folktales are unique to African-American culture, while others are influenced by African, European, and Native American tales.

Overview 
African-American folktales is a storytelling tradition based in Africa containing a rich oral tradition that expanded as Africans were brought to the Americas as slaves. In general, most African-American Folktales fall into one of seven categories:  tales of origin, tales of trickery and trouble, tales of triumph over natural or supernatural evils, comic heartwarming tales, tales teaching life lessons, tales of ghosts and spirits, and tales of slaves and their slave-owners. Many revolve around animals with human characteristics and the same morals and shortcomings as humans which help to make the stories relatable. New tales tell of the experiences of Africans in the Americas, while many tales maintain the traditional style and tell of their African roots. Although many of the original stories evolved since Africans were brought to the Americas as slaves, their meaning and life lessons have remained the same.

Themes
African-American tales of origin center around beginnings and transformations whether focused on a character, event, or creation of the world. Some examples of origin stories include "How Jackal Became an Outcast" and "Terrapin's Magic Dipper and Whip", that respectively explain the solitary nature of jackals and why turtles have shells.

Trickery and trouble 

Tricksters in folk stories are commonly amoral characters, both human and non-human animals, who 'succeed' based on deception and taking advantage of the weaknesses of others. They tend to use their wits to resolve conflict and/or achieve their goals. Two examples of African-American tricksters are Brer Rabbit and Anansi.

Tricksters in African American folktales take a comedic approach and contain an underlying theme of inequality. The National Humanities Center notes that trickster stories "contain serious commentary on the inequities of existence in a country where the promises of democracy were denied to a large portion of the citizenry, a pattern that becomes even clearer in the literary adaptations of trickster figures".

The folktales don't always contain an actual 'trickster'  but a theme of trickery tactics. For example, Charles Chesnutt's collected a series of stories titled The Conjure Woman (1899). One of the story trickster tactics is "how an enslaved man is spared being sent from one plantation to another by having his wife, who is a conjure woman, turn him into a tree...the trickery works until a local sawmill selects that particular tree to cut".

During the period of slavery, "and for decades thereafter, trickster tales, with their subtly and indirection, were necessary because blacks could not risk a direct attack on white society".

Comic heartwarming tales 
Comic and heartwarming African-American folktales “stimulate the imagination with wonders, and are told to remind us of the perils and the possibilities”. The stories are about heroes, heroines, villains and fools. One story, The Red Feather, is a response to the intertwining of cultures, ending with heroes bringing forth gifts.  Rabbit Rides Wolf is a story that represents the amalgamation of African and Creek descent where a combined hero emerges during a time of conflict .

Teaching life lessons 
African folklore is a means to hand down traditions and duties through generations. Stories are often passed down orally at gatherings of groups of children. This type of gathering was known as Tales by Midnight and contained cultural lessons that prepared children for their future.  A Diversity of animals with human characteristics made the stories compelling to the young children and included singing and dancing or themes such as greediness, honesty, and loyalty.

One story example used for generations of African children is the Tale of The Midnight Goat Thief that originated in Zimbabwe. The Midnight Goat Thief is a tale of misplaced trust and betrayal between two friends, a baboon and a hare, when a conflict between the two arises. The story teaches children to be loyal and honest.

Ghosts and spirits 
African-American tales of ghosts and spirits were commonly told of a spook or “haint”  or “haunt,” referring to repeated visits by ghosts or spirits that keep one awake at night. The story Possessed of Two Spirits is a personal experience in conjuring magic powers in both the living and the spiritual world common in African-American folklore. The story Married to a Boar Hog emerged during the colonial Revolution against the British. The story is of a young woman who married a supernatural being figure, such as a boar, who saves her from a disease like leprosy, club foot, or yaws. Married to a Boar Hog is passed down from British Caribbean slaves in reference to their African Origin and the hardships they endured.

Slavery 

African-American tales of slavery often use rhetoric that can seem uncommon to the modern era as the language passed down through generations deviates from the standard for racial narrative. The Conjure Woman, a book of tales dealing with racial identity, was written by the African-American author, Charles W. Chesnutt, from the perspective of a freed slave.

Chesnutt's tales represent the struggles freed slaves faced during the post-war era in the South. The author's tales provide a pensive perspective on the challenges of being left behind.

Chesnutt's language surrounding African American folklore derived from the standards of the racial narrative of his era. By using vernacular language, Chesnutt was able to deviate from the racial norms and formulate a new, more valorized message of folk heroes.  Chesnutt writes "on the other side" of standard racial narratives, effectively refuting them by evoking a different kind of "racial project" in his fictional work.”

High John the Conqueror 

In the book Mojo Workin: The Old African American Hoodoo System, discusses the folk spirit High John the Conqueror whose spirit resides in the "High John the Conqueror root" in the Hoodoo tradition. In African American folk stories, High John the Conqueror was an African prince who was kidnapped from Africa and enslaved in the United States. He was a trickster, and used his wit and charm to deceive and outsmart his slaveholders. After the American Civil War, before High John the Conqueror returned to Africa, he told the newly freed slaves that if they ever needed his spirit for freedom his spirit would reside in a root they could use. According to some scholars, the origin of High John the Conqueror may have originated from African male deities such as Elegua who is a trickster spirit in West Africa. Zora Neal Hurston documented some history about High John the Conqueror from her discussions with African Americans in the South in her book, The Sanctified Church. Some African Americans believed High John the Conqueror freed the slaves, and that President Abraham Lincoln and the Civil War did not bring freedom for Blacks. According to one woman, Aunt Shady Anne Sutton interviewed by Hurston, she said: "These young Negroes reads they books and talk about the war freeing the Negroes, by Aye Lord! A heap sees, but a few knows. 'Course, the war was a lot of help, but how come the war took place? They think they knows, but they don't. John de Conqueror had done put it into the white folks to give us our freedom." Anne Sutton said the spirit of High John de Conqueror taught Black people about freedom and to prepare for their freedom in an upcoming war. The High John the Conqueror root used by African Americans prevented whippings from slaveholders and provided freedom from chattel slavery. The root given to Frederick Douglass was a High John root that prevented Douglass from being whipped and beaten by a slave-breaker. Former slave Henry Bibb used the High John root to protect himself by chewing and spitting the root towards his enslaver.

Flying Africans 

Flying Africans of legend escaped enslavement by a magical flight over the ocean back to Africa. Novelist Toni Morrison makes references to African American spirituality in her literature, and in her 1977 novel Song of Solomon published in 1977, tells the story of the character Milkman an African American in search of his African ancestors. Milkman lived in the North but returned to the South in search of his ancestry. By the end of the book Milkman learns he comes from a family of African medicine people and gained his ancestral powers and his soul flew back to Africa after he died. The legend may have been inspired by a historical event in Georgia. In 1803, a slave ship landed on the coast of Georgia in St. Simons Island with captive Africans from Nigeria with a cargo of Igbo people. The Igbo people chose suicide than a life time of slavery by walking into the swamp and drowning. This location became known as Igbo landing in Georgia. According to African American folklore, the souls of the Igbos that committed suicide flew back to Africa.

Sukey and The Mermaid 

In African-American folklore there is a story about a girl named Sukey meeting a mermaid named Mama Jo. Mama Jo in the story helps and protects Sukey and financially supported her by giving her gold coins. This story comes from the belief in Simbi spirits in West-Central Africa that came to the United States during the trans-atlantic slave trade. In Africa, Simbi nature spirits protect and provide riches to their followers. In West-Central Africa, there are folk stories of people meeting mermaids. Among the Gullah Geechee people in the Carolina Lowcountry and Sea Islands, there is a children's story called Sukey and the Mermaid written by Robert D. San Souci. In the African Diaspora, there are Afro-American folk stories of a little girl meeting a mermaid. During the era of slavery, Simbi folk stories in enslaved black communities provided hope from enslavement. It was believed that Simbi spirits help guide freedom seekers (runaway slaves) to freedom or to maroon communities during their escape from slavery on the Underground Railroad, because Simbi spirits reside in nature.

African-American folktale examples
A Story, A Story – by Gale E. Hayley
Afiong the Proud Princess
Anansi the Spider – by Gerald McDermott
Big Liz
Boo Hag
Br'er Bear's House
 Br'er Rabbit
Finding the Green Stone – by Alice Walker
Gullah storytelling
Hold Him, Tabb
I Know Moon Rise
I'm Coming Down Now
John Henry (folklore)|John Henry the Steel Driving Man
Mirandy and Brother Wind
Mufaro's Beautiful Daughters – by John Steptoe
Never Mind Them Watermelons
No King as God
Signifying monkey
Sukey and the Mermaid – by Robert D. San Souci
The Baby Mouse and the Baby Snake
The Black Cat's Message
The Calabash Kids – from Tanzania
The Cheetah and the Lazy Hunter – from the Zulu
The Midnight Goat Thief
The Shrouded Horseman
The Talking Eggs – by Robert D. San Souci
The Value of a Person
Wait Until Emmet Comes
Why Dogs Chase Cats
Why Lizards Don't Sit
Why Mosquitoes Buzz in People's Ears – Verna Aardema
Why the Sky is Far Away – by Mary-Joan Gerson
Woe and Happiness

See also
Anansi
Br'er Bear
Hausa people
J. Mason Brewer 
Nigeria
Sanankuya
Tanzania
The Dozens
Zulu people
Slavery in the United States
Treatment of the enslaved in the United States

References

Further reading
 Coughlan, Margaret N., and Library of Congress. Children's Book Section. Folklore From Africa to the United States: an Annotated Bibliography. Washington: Library of Congress: for sale by the Supt. of Docs., U.S. Govt. Print. Off, 1976.
 Marsh, Vivian Costroma Osborne. Types And Distribution of Negro Folk-lore In America. [Berkeley], 1922.

Folktales
Storytelling
American folklore